Lai Yonghai is a Chinese philosopher of religion. He is currently a professor of the Department of Philosophy at Nanjing University and the dean of the Institute of Chinese Culture at Nanjing University.

References

Nanjing University alumni
People from Zhangzhou
Academic staff of Nanjing University
Living people
Year of birth missing (living people)
21st-century Chinese philosophers
Philosophers of religion